This is a list of Brazilian television related events from 1996.

Events

Debuts
1 April - Cocoricó (1996–present)

Television shows

1970s
Turma da Mônica (1976–present)

1990s
Castelo Rá-Tim-Bum (1994-1997)
Malhação (1995–present)

Births

Deaths

6 November - Madalena Nicol, actress

See also
1996 in Brazil